The Arkansas River shiner (Notropis girardi) is a species of ray-finned fish in the genus Notropis. It is native to part of the central United States. Historically this shiner was widespread and abundant throughout the western portions of the Arkansas River basin in Kansas, New Mexico, Oklahoma, and Texas. It is extirpated from the River in Kansas and Oklahoma. Recently, the species was almost entirely confined to about 820 km (510 mi)  of the Canadian River in Oklahoma, Texas, and New Mexico, but it has been introduced and is now widely established in Pecos River in New Mexico.

References 

 Robert Jay Goldstein, Rodney W. Harper, Richard Edwards: American Aquarium Fishes. Texas A&M University Press 2000, p. 86
 

Notropis
Fish described in 1929